John Cox (7 May 1908 – September 1972) was an English sound engineer. He won an Academy Award for Sound Recording and was nominated for two more in the same category. He worked on over 140 films between 1931 and 1972.

Selected filmography
Won
 Lawrence of Arabia (1962)

Nominated
 The Guns of Navarone (1961)
 Becket (1964)

References

External links

1908 births
1972 deaths
English audio engineers
People from Leicester
Best Sound Mixing Academy Award winners